Glasgow (or) is the most populous city in Scotland and the fourth-most populous city in the United Kingdom, as well as being the 27th largest city by population in Europe. In 2020, it had an estimated population of 635,640. The city was made a county of itself in 1893, prior to which it had been in the historic county of Lanarkshire. The city now forms the Glasgow City Council area, one of the 32 council areas of Scotland, and is governed by Glasgow City Council. It is situated on the River Clyde in the country's West Central Lowlands.

Glasgow has the largest economy in Scotland and the third-highest GDP per capita of any city in the UK. Glasgow's major cultural institutions – the Burrell Collection, Kelvingrove Art Gallery and Museum, the Royal Conservatoire of Scotland, the Royal Scottish National Orchestra, Scottish Ballet and Scottish Opera – enjoy international reputations. The city was the European Capital of Culture in 1990 and is notable for its architecture, culture, media, music scene, sports clubs and transport connections. It is the fifth-most visited city in the United Kingdom. The city hosted the 2021 United Nations Climate Change Conference (COP26) at its main events venue, the SEC Centre. Glasgow hosted the 2014 Commonwealth Games and the first European Championships in 2018, and was one of the host cities for UEFA Euro 2020. The city is also well known in the sporting world for football, particularly for the Old Firm rivalry.

Glasgow grew from a small rural settlement on the River Clyde to become the largest seaport in Scotland, and tenth largest by tonnage in Britain. Expanding from the medieval bishopric and royal burgh, and the later establishment of the University of Glasgow in the 15th century, it became a major centre of the Scottish Enlightenment in the 18th century. From the 18th century onwards, the city also grew as one of Britain's main hubs of transatlantic trade with North America and the West Indies. With the onset of the Industrial Revolution, the population and economy of Glasgow and the surrounding region expanded rapidly to become one of the world's pre-eminent centres of chemicals, textiles and engineering; most notably in the shipbuilding and marine engineering industry, which produced many innovative and famous vessels. Glasgow was the "Second City of the British Empire" for much of the Victorian and Edwardian eras.

In the late 19th and early 20th centuries, Glasgow's population grew rapidly, reaching a peak of 1,127,825 people in 1938. The population was greatly reduced following comprehensive urban renewal projects in the 1960s which resulted in large-scale relocation of people to designated new towns, such as Cumbernauld, Livingston, East Kilbride and peripheral suburbs, followed by successive boundary changes. Over 985,200 people live in the Greater Glasgow contiguous urban area, while the wider Glasgow City Region is home to over 1,800,000 people, equating to around 33% of Scotland's population. The city has one of the highest densities of any locality in Scotland at 4,023/km2.

Etymology
The name Glasgow is Brittonic in origin. The first element glas, meaning "grey-green, grey-blue" both in Brittonic, Scottish Gaelic and modern day Welsh and the second *cöü, "hollow" (cf. Welsh glas-cau), giving a meaning of "green-hollow".  The green-hollow may refer to the ravine to the east of Glasgow Cathedral. It is often said that the name means "dear green place" or that "dear green place" is a translation from Gaelic Glas Caomh.  "The dear green place" remains an affectionate way of referring to the city. The modern Gaelic is Glaschu and derived from the same roots as the English.

The settlement probably had an earlier Cumbric name, Cathures; the modern name appears for the first time in the Gaelic period (1116), as Glasgu. It is also recorded that the King of Strathclyde, Rhydderch Hael, welcomed Saint Kentigern (also known as Saint Mungo), and procured his consecration as bishop about 540. For some thirteen years Kentigern laboured in the region, building his church at the Molendinar Burn where Glasgow Cathedral now stands, and making many converts. A large community developed around him and became known as Glasgu.

History

Origins and development
The area around Glasgow has hosted communities for millennia, with the River Clyde providing a natural location for fishing. The Romans later built outposts in the area and, to protect Roman Britannia from the Brittonic speaking (Celtic) Caledonians, constructed the Antonine Wall. Items from the wall, such as altars from Roman forts like Balmuildy, can be found at the Hunterian Museum today.

Glasgow itself was reputed to have been founded by the Christian missionary Saint Mungo in the 6th century. He established a church on the Molendinar Burn, where the present Glasgow Cathedral stands, and in the following years Glasgow became a religious centre.
Glasgow grew over the following centuries. The Glasgow Fair reportedly began in 1190. A bridge over the River Clyde was recorded from around 1285, where Victoria Bridge now stands. As the lowest bridging point on the Clyde it was an important crossing. The area around the bridge became known as Briggait. The founding of the University of Glasgow adjoining the cathedral in 1451 and elevation of the bishopric to become the Archdiocese of Glasgow in 1492 increased the town's religious and educational status and landed wealth. Its early trade was in agriculture, brewing and fishing, with cured salmon and herring being exported to Europe and the Mediterranean. By the fifteenth century the urban area stretched from the area around the cathedral and university in the north down to the bridge and the banks of the Clyde in the south along High Street, Saltmarket and Bridgegate, crossing an east-west route at Glasgow Cross which became the commercial centre of the city.

Following the European Protestant Reformation and with the encouragement of the Convention of Royal Burghs, the 14 incorporated trade crafts federated as the Trades House in 1605 to match the power and influence in the town council of the earlier Merchants' Guilds who established their Merchants House in the same year. Glasgow was subsequently raised to the status of Royal Burgh in 1611. Glasgow's substantial fortunes came from international trade, manufacturing and invention, starting in the 17th century with sugar, followed by tobacco, and then cotton and linen, products of the Atlantic triangular slave trade.

Daniel Defoe visited the city in the early 18th century and famously opined in his book A tour thro' the whole island of Great Britain, that Glasgow was "the cleanest and beautifullest, and best built city in Britain, London excepted". At that time the city's population was about 12,000, and the city was yet to undergo the massive expansionary changes to its economy and urban fabric, brought about by the Scottish Enlightenment and Industrial Revolution.

Trading port
After the Acts of Union in 1707, Scotland gained further access to the vast markets of the new British Empire, and Glasgow became prominent as a hub of international trade to and from the Americas, especially in sugar, tobacco, cotton, and manufactured goods. Starting in 1668, the city's Tobacco Lords created a deep water port at Port Glasgow about  down the River Clyde, as the river from the city to that point was then too shallow for seagoing merchant ships. At the time, Glasgow held a commercial importance as the city participated in the trade of sugar, tobacco and later cotton. From the mid-eighteenth century the city began expanding westwards from its medieval core, with a grid-iron street plan laid out from 1772 to accommodate much of the growth, with the new area later becoming known as the Merchant City.

Industrialisation

The opening of the Monkland Canal and basin linking to the Forth and Clyde Canal at Port Dundas in 1795, facilitated access to the extensive iron-ore and coal mines in Lanarkshire. After extensive river engineering projects to dredge and deepen the River Clyde as far as Glasgow, shipbuilding became a major industry on the upper stretches of the river, pioneered by industrialists such as Robert Napier, John Elder, George Thomson, Sir William Pearce and Sir Alfred Yarrow. The River Clyde also became an important source of inspiration for artists, such as John Atkinson Grimshaw, John Knox, James Kay, Sir Muirhead Bone, Robert Eadie and L.S. Lowry, willing to depict the new industrial era and the modern world, as did Stanley Spencer downriver at Port Glasgow.

Glasgow's population had surpassed that of Edinburgh by 1821. The development of civic institutions included the City of Glasgow Police in 1800, one of the first municipal police forces in the world. Despite the crisis caused by the City of Glasgow Bank's collapse in 1878, growth continued and by the end of the 19th century it was one of the cities known as the "Second City of the Empire" and was producing more than half Britain's tonnage of shipping and a quarter of all locomotives in the world. In addition to its pre-eminence in shipbuilding, engineering, industrial machinery, bridge building, chemicals, explosives, coal and oil industries it developed as a major centre in textiles, garment-making, carpet manufacturing, leather processing, furniture-making, pottery, food, drink and cigarette making; printing and publishing. Shipping, banking, insurance and professional services expanded at the same time.

Glasgow became one of the first cities in Europe to reach a population of one million. The city's new trades and sciences attracted new residents from across the Lowlands and the Highlands of Scotland, from Ireland and other parts of Britain and from Continental Europe. During this period, the construction of many of the city's greatest architectural masterpieces and most ambitious civil engineering projects, such as the Milngavie water treatment works, Glasgow Subway, Glasgow Corporation Tramways, City Chambers, Mitchell Library and Kelvingrove Art Gallery and Museum were being funded by its wealth. The city also held a series of International Exhibitions at Kelvingrove Park, in 1888, 1901 and 1911, with Britain's last major International Exhibition, the Empire Exhibition, being subsequently held in 1938 at Bellahouston Park, which drew 13 million visitors.

The 20th century witnessed both decline and renewal in the city. After World War I, the city suffered from the impact of the Post–World War I recession and from the later Great Depression, this also led to a rise of radical socialism and the "Red Clydeside" movement. The city had recovered by the outbreak of World War II. The city saw aerial bombardment by the Luftwaffe during the Clydebank Blitz, during the war, then grew through the post-war boom that lasted through the 1950s. By the 1960s, growth of industry in countries like Japan and West Germany, weakened the once pre-eminent position of many of the city's industries. As a result of this, Glasgow entered a lengthy period of relative economic decline and rapid de-industrialisation, leading to high unemployment, urban decay, population decline, welfare dependency and poor health for the city's inhabitants. There were active attempts at regeneration of the city, when the Glasgow Corporation published its controversial Bruce Report, which set out a comprehensive series of initiatives aimed at turning round the decline of the city. The report led to a huge and radical programme of rebuilding and regeneration efforts that started in the mid-1950s and lasted into the late 1970s. This involved the mass demolition of the city's infamous slums and their replacement with large suburban housing estates and tower blocks.

The city invested heavily in roads infrastructure, with an extensive system of arterial roads and motorways that bisected the central area. There are also accusations that the Scottish Office had deliberately attempted to undermine Glasgow's economic and political influence in post-war Scotland by diverting inward investment in new industries to other regions during the Silicon Glen boom and creating the new towns of Cumbernauld, Glenrothes, Irvine, Livingston and East Kilbride, dispersed across the Scottish Lowlands to halve the city's population base. By the late 1980s, there had been a significant resurgence in Glasgow's economic fortunes. The "Glasgow's miles better" campaign, launched in 1983, and opening of the Burrell Collection in 1983 and Scottish Exhibition and Conference Centre in 1985 facilitated Glasgow's new role as a European centre for business services and finance and promoted an increase in tourism and inward investment. The latter continues to be bolstered by the legacy of the city's Glasgow Garden Festival in 1988, its status as European Capital of Culture in 1990, and concerted attempts to diversify the city's economy. However, it is the industrial heritage that serves as key tourism enabler. Wider economic revival has persisted and the ongoing regeneration of inner-city areas, including the large-scale Clyde Waterfront Regeneration, has led to more affluent people moving back to live in the centre of Glasgow, fuelling allegations of gentrification. In 2008, the city was listed by Lonely Planet as one of the world's top 10 tourist cities.

Despite Glasgow's economic renaissance, the East End of the city remains the focus of social deprivation. A Glasgow Economic Audit report published in 2007 stated that the gap between prosperous and deprived areas of the city is widening. In 2006, 47% of Glasgow's population lived in the most deprived 15% of areas in Scotland, while the Centre for Social Justice reported 29.4% of the city's working-age residents to be "economically inactive". Although marginally behind the UK average, Glasgow still has a higher employment rate than Birmingham, Liverpool and Manchester. In 2008 the city was ranked at 43 for Personal Safety in the Mercer index of top 50 safest cities in the world. The Mercer report was specifically looking at Quality of Living, yet by 2011 within Glasgow, certain areas were (still) "failing to meet the Scottish Air Quality Objective levels for nitrogen dioxide (NO2) and particulate matter (PM10)".

Sanitation
With the population growing, the first scheme to provide a public water supply was by the Glasgow Company in 1806. A second company was formed in 1812, and the two merged in 1838, but there was some dissatisfaction with the quality of the water supplied. The Gorbals Gravitation Water Company began supplying water to residents living to the south of the River Clyde in 1846, obtained from reservoirs, which gave 75,000 people a constant water supply, but others were not so fortunate, and some 4,000 died in an outbreak of cholera in 1848/1849. This led to the development of the Glasgow Corporation Water Works, with a project to raise the level of Loch Katrine and to convey clean water by gravity along a  aqueduct to a holding reservoir at Milngavie, and then by pipes into the city. The project cost £980,000 and was opened by Queen Victoria in 1859.
In the early 19th century an eighth of the people lived in single-room accommodation.

The engineer for the project was John Frederick Bateman, while James Morris Gale became the resident engineer for the city section of the project, and subsequently became Engineer in Chief for Glasgow Water Commissioners. He oversaw several improvements during his tenure, including a second aqueduct and further raising of water levels in Loch Katrine. Additional supplies were provided by Loch Arklet in 1902, by impounding the water and creating a tunnel to allow water to flow into Loch Katrine. A similar scheme to create a reservoir in Glen Finglas was authorised in 1903, but was deferred, and was not completed until 1965. Following the 2002 Glasgow floods, the waterborne parasite cryptosporidium was found in the reservoir at Milngavie, and so the new Milngavie water treatment works was built. It was opened by Queen Elizabeth in 2007, and won the 2007 Utility Industry Achievement Award, having been completed ahead of its time schedule and for £10 million below its budgeted cost.

Good health requires both clean water and effective removal of sewage. The Caledonian Railway rebuilt many of the sewers, as part of a deal to allow them to tunnel under the city, and sewage treatment works were opened at Dalmarnoch in 1894, Dalmuir in 1904 and Shieldhall in 1910. The works experimented to find better ways to treat sewage, and a number of experimental filters were constructed, until a full activated sludge plant was built between 1962 and 1968 at a cost of £4 million. Treated sludge was dumped at sea, and Glasgow Corporation owned six sludge ships between 1904 and 1998, when the EU Urban Waste Water Treatment Directive ended the practice. It will reduce the risk of flooding and the likelihood that sewage will overflow into the Clyde during storms. Since 2002, clean water provision and sewerage have been the responsibility of Scottish Water.

Heraldry

The coat of arms of the City of Glasgow was granted to the royal burgh by the Lord Lyon on 25 October 1866. It incorporates a number of symbols and emblems associated with the life of Glasgow's patron saint, Mungo, which had been used on official seals prior to that date. The emblems represent miracles supposed to have been performed by Mungo and are listed in the traditional rhyme:
Here's the bird that never flew
Here's the tree that never grew
Here's the bell that never rang
Here's the fish that never swam

St Mungo is also said to have preached a sermon containing the words Lord, Let Glasgow flourish by the preaching of the word and the praising of thy name. This was abbreviated to "Let Glasgow Flourish" and adopted as the city's motto.

In 1450, John Stewart, the first Lord Provost of Glasgow, left an endowment so that a "St Mungo's Bell" could be made and tolled throughout the city so that the citizens would pray for his soul. A new bell was purchased by the magistrates in 1641 and that bell is still on display in the People's Palace Museum, near Glasgow Green.

The supporters are two salmon bearing rings, and the crest is a half length figure of Saint Mungo. He wears a bishop's mitre and liturgical vestments and has his hand raised in "the act of benediction". The original 1866 grant placed the crest atop a helm, but this was removed in subsequent grants. The current version (1996) has a gold mural crown between the shield and the crest. This form of coronet, resembling an embattled city wall, was allowed to the four area councils with city status.

The arms were re-matriculated by the City of Glasgow District Council on 6 February 1975, and by the present area council on 25 March 1996. The only change made on each occasion was in the type of coronet over the arms.

Government and politics

Local government

Although Glasgow Corporation had been a pioneer in the municipal socialist movement from the late-nineteenth century, since the Representation of the People Act 1918, Glasgow increasingly supported left-wing ideas and politics at a national level. The city council was controlled by the Labour Party for over thirty years, since the decline of the Progressives. Since 2007, when local government elections in Scotland began to use the single transferable vote rather than the first-past-the-post system, the dominance of the Labour Party within the city started to decline. As a result of the 2017 United Kingdom local elections, the SNP was able to form a minority administration ending Labour's thirty-seven years of uninterrupted control.

In the aftermath of the Russian Revolution of 1917 and the German Revolution of 1918–19, the city's frequent strikes and militant organisations caused serious alarm at Westminster, with one uprising in January 1919 prompting the Liberal Prime Minister, David Lloyd George, to deploy 10,000 soldiers and tanks on the city's streets. A huge demonstration in the city's George Square on 31 January ended in violence after the Riot Act was read.

Industrial action at the shipyards gave rise to the "Red Clydeside" epithet. During the 1930s, Glasgow was the main base of the Independent Labour Party. Towards the end of the twentieth century, it became a centre of the struggle against the poll tax; which was introduced in Scotland a whole year before the rest of the United Kingdom and also served as the main base of the Scottish Socialist Party, another left-wing political party in Scotland. The city has not had a Conservative MP since the 1982 Hillhead by-election, when the SDP took the seat, which was in Glasgow's most affluent area. The fortunes of the Conservative Party continued to decline into the twenty-first century, winning only one of the 79 councillors on Glasgow City Council in 2012, despite having been the controlling party (as the Progressives) from 1969 to 1972 when Sir Donald Liddle was the last non-Labour Lord Provost.

Glasgow is represented in both the House of Commons in London, and the Scottish Parliament in Holyrood, Edinburgh. At Westminster, it is represented by seven Members of Parliament (MPs), all elected at least once every five years to represent individual constituencies, using the first-past-the-post system of voting. In Holyrood, Glasgow is represented by sixteen Members of the Scottish Parliament (MSPs), of whom nine are elected to represent individual constituencies once every four years using first-past-the-post, and seven are elected as additional regional members, by proportional representation. Since the 2016 Scottish Parliament election, Glasgow is represented at Holyrood by
9 Scottish National Party MSPs, 4 Labour MSPs, 2 Conservative MSPs and 1 Scottish Green MSP. In the European Parliament, the city formed part of the Scotland constituency, which elected six Members of the European Parliament (MEPs) prior to Brexit.

Central government

Since Glasgow is covered and operates under two separate central governments, the devolved Scottish Parliament and UK Government, they determine various matters that Glasgow City Council is not responsible for.

Scottish Parliament
The Glasgow electoral region of the Scottish Parliament covers the Glasgow City council area, a north-western part of South Lanarkshire and a small eastern portion of Renfrewshire. It elects nine of the parliament's 73 first past the post constituency members and seven of the 56 additional members. Both kinds of member are known as Members of the Scottish Parliament (MSPs). The system of election is designed to produce a form of proportional representation.

The first past the post seats were created in 1999 with the names and boundaries of then existing Westminster (House of Commons) constituencies. In 2005, the number of Westminster Members of Parliament (MPs) representing Scotland was cut to 59, with new constituencies being formed, while the existing number of MSPs was retained at Holyrood. In the 2011 Scottish Parliament election, the boundaries of the Glasgow region were redrawn.

Currently, the nine Scottish Parliament constituencies in the Glasgow electoral region are:
 Glasgow Anniesland
 Glasgow Cathcart
 Glasgow Kelvin
 Glasgow Maryhill and Springburn
 Glasgow Pollok
 Glasgow Provan
 Glasgow Shettleston
 Glasgow Southside
 Rutherglen

At the 2021 Scottish Parliament election, all nine of these constituencies were won by Scottish National Party (SNP) candidates. On the regional vote, the Glasgow electoral region is represented by four Labour MSPs, two Conservative MSPs and one Green MSP.

UK Parliament
Following reform of constituencies of the House of Commons of the United Kingdom (Westminster) in 2005, which reduced the number of Scottish Members of Parliament (MPs), the current Westminster constituencies representing Glasgow are:
 Glasgow Central
 Glasgow East
 Glasgow North
 Glasgow North East
 Glasgow North West
 Glasgow South
 Glasgow South West

Following the 2014 Scottish independence referendum, in which 53.49% of the electorate of Glasgow voted in favour of Scottish independence; the SNP won every seat in the city at the 2015 general election, including a record-breaking 39.3% swing from Labour to SNP in the Glasgow North East constituency.

At the 2017 snap general election, Glasgow was represented by 6 Scottish National Party MPs and 1 Labour MP; the Glasgow North East constituency which had a record 39.3% swing from Labour to SNP at the previous general election, was regained by Paul Sweeney of the Labour Party, who narrowly defeated sitting SNP MP Anne McLaughlin by 242 votes.

Since the 2019 general election, Glasgow has been represented by 7 Scottish National Party MPs; the Glasgow North East constituency, was regained by Anne McLaughlin of the Scottish National Party, resulting in the same clean sweep like 4 years previously.

Referendums
In the Scottish independence referendum, Glasgow voted "Yes" by a margin of 53.5% to 46.5%.

In the Brexit referendum, results varied from constituency to constituency. Glasgow North recorded the biggest remain vote with 78% opting to stay in the EU whilst in Glasgow East this figure dropped to 56%. The city as a whole voted to remain in the EU, by 66.6% to 33.3%.

Voter turnout
Voter turnout has often been lower in Glasgow than in the rest of the United Kingdom. In the Referendum of 2014 turnout was 75%, the lowest in Scotland; in the Brexit referendum the city's voters, while joining the rest of Scotland in voting to remain part of the EU, again had a low turnout of 56.2%, although SNP MP Angus Robertson placed this in the historical context of traditional low turnout in Glasgow.

In the 2015 general election, the six Scottish constituencies with the lowest turnout were all in Glasgow; turnout further decreased in the 2017 election, when five of the city's seven seats reported a lowered turnout.

Geography

Glasgow is located on the banks of the River Clyde, in West Central Scotland. Another important river is the Kelvin, a tributary of the River Clyde, whose name was used in creating the title of Baron Kelvin the renowned physicist for whom the SI unit of temperature, Kelvin, is named.

The burgh of Glasgow was historically in Lanarkshire, but close to the border with Renfrewshire. When elected county councils were established in 1890, Glasgow was deemed capable of running its own affairs and so was excluded from the administrative area of Lanarkshire County Council, whilst remaining part of Lanarkshire for lieutenancy and judicial purposes. The burgh was substantially enlarged in 1891 to take in areas from both Lanarkshire and Renfrewshire where the urban area had grown beyond the old burgh boundary. In 1893, the burgh became its own county for lieutenancy and judicial purposes too, being made a county of itself.

From 1975 to 1996 the city was part of Strathclyde Region, with the city's council becoming a lower-tier district council. Strathclyde was abolished in 1996, since when the city has again been responsible for all aspects of local government, being one of the 32 council areas in Scotland.

Location

Glasgow is located in the central belt of Scotland.

Climate

Despite its northerly latitude, similar to that of Moscow, Glasgow's climate is classified as oceanic (Köppen Cfb).
Data is available online for 3 official weather stations in the Glasgow area: Paisley, Abbotsinch and Bishopton. All are located to the west of the city, in neighbouring Renfrewshire.
Owing to its westerly position and proximity to the Atlantic Ocean, Glasgow is one of Scotland's milder areas. Winter temperatures are usually higher than in most places of equal latitude away from the UK, due to the warming influence of the Gulf Stream. However, this results in less distinct seasons as compared to continental Western Europe. At Paisley, the annual precipitation averages . Glasgow has been named as the rainiest city of the UK, having an average of 170 days of rain a year.

Since 2000 Glasgow has experienced few very cold, snowy and harsh winters where temperatures have fallen much below freezing. Snowfall accumulation is infrequent and short-lived. The spring months (March to May) are usually mild and often quite pleasant. Many of Glasgow's trees and plants begin to flower at this time of the year and parks and gardens are filled with spring colours.

During the summer months (June to August) the weather can vary considerably from day to day, ranging from relatively cool and wet to quite warm with the odd sunny day. Long dry spells of warm weather are generally quite scarce. Overcast and humid conditions without rain are frequent. Generally the weather pattern is quite unsettled and erratic during these months, with only occasional heatwaves. The warmest month is usually July, with average highs above . Summer days can occasionally reach up to 27 °C (81 °F), and very rarely exceed 30 °C (86 °F). Autumns are generally cool to mild with increasing precipitation. During early autumn there can be some settled periods of weather and it can feel pleasant with mild temperatures and some sunny days.

The official Met Office data series goes back to 1959 and shows that there only have been a few warm and no hot summers in Glasgow, in stark contrast to areas further south in Great Britain and eastwards in Europe. Even this extreme event only matched a normal summer on similar parallels in continental Europe, underlining the maritime influences. The coldest month on record since the data series began is December 2010, during a severe cold wave affecting the British Isles. This still ensured Glasgow's coldest month of 2010 remained milder than the isotherm of  normally used to determine continental climate normals.

 at Bishopton in June 2018.

Demographics

In the 1950s, the population of the City of Glasgow area peaked at 1,089,000. Glasgow was then one of the most densely populated cities in the world. After the 1960s, clearances of poverty-stricken inner city areas like the Gorbals and relocation to "new towns" such as East Kilbride and Cumbernauld led to population decline. In addition, the boundaries of the city were changed twice during the late-twentieth century, making direct comparisons difficult.

There are two distinct definitions for the population of Glasgow: the Glasgow City Council Area which lost the districts of Rutherglen and Cambuslang to South Lanarkshire in 1996, and the Greater Glasgow Urban Area which includes the conurbation around the city (however in the 2016 definitions the aforementioned Rutherglen and Cambuslang were included along with the likes of Paisley, Clydebank, Newton Mearns, Bearsden and Stepps but not others with no continuity of populated postcodes – although in some cases the gap is small – the excluded nearby settlements including Barrhead, Erskine and Kirkintilloch plus a large swathe of Lanarkshire which had been considered contiguous with Glasgow in previous definitions: the 'settlements' named Coatbridge & Airdrie, Hamilton and Motherwell & Wishaw, each containing a number of distinct smaller localities).

Glasgow's population influx in the eighteenth and nineteenth centuries was related to economic expansion as well as internally generated growth with the vast majority of newcomers to the city from outside Scotland being from Ireland, especially the north western counties of Donegal, Fermanagh, Tyrone and Londonderry. In the 1881 UK Census, 83% of the population was born in Scotland, 13% in Ireland, 3% in England and 1% elsewhere. By 1911, the city was no longer gaining population by migration. The demographic percentages in the 1951 UK census were: born in Scotland 93%, Ireland 3%, England 3% and elsewhere 1%. In the early twentieth century, many Lithuanian refugees began to settle in Glasgow and at its height in the 1950s; there were around 10,000 in the Glasgow area. Many Italian Scots also settled in Glasgow, originating from provinces like Frosinone in Lazio and Lucca in north-west Tuscany at this time, many originally working as "Hokey Pokey" men.

In the 1960s and 1970s, many Asians also settled in Glasgow, mainly in the Pollokshields area. These number 30,000 Pakistanis, 15,000 Indians and 3,000 Bangladeshis as well as Chinese people, many of whom settled in the Garnethill area of the city. Since 2000, the UK government has pursued a policy of dispersal of asylum seekers to ease pressure on social housing in the London area. The city is also home to some 8,406 (1.42%) Poles.

Since the United Kingdom Census 2001 the population decline has been reversed. The population was static for a time; but due to migration from other parts of Scotland as well as immigration from overseas, the population has begun to grow. The population of the city council area was 593,245 in 2011 and around 2,300,000 people live in the Glasgow travel to work area. This area is defined as consisting of over 10% of residents travelling into Glasgow to work and is without fixed boundaries.

The population density of London following the 2011 census was recorded as 5,200 people per square kilometre, while 3,395 people per square kilometre were registered in Glasgow.

In 2005, Glasgow had the lowest life expectancy of any UK city at 72.9 years. Much was made of this during the 2008 Glasgow East by-election. In 2008, a World Health Organization report about health inequalities, revealing that male life expectancy varied from 54 years in Calton to 82 years in nearby Lenzie, East Dunbartonshire.

Areas and suburbs

City centre

The city centre is bounded by High Street up to Glasgow Cathedral at Castle Street, Glasgow Cross, Saltmarket including Glasgow Green and St Andrew's Square to the east; Clyde Street and Broomielaw (along the River Clyde) to the south; and Charing Cross and Elmbank Street, beyond Blythswood Square to the west.  The northern boundary (from east to west) follows Cathedral Street to North Hanover Street and George Square.

Retail and theatre district

The city centre is based on a grid system of streets on the north bank of the River Clyde. The heart of the city is George Square, site of many of Glasgow's public statues and the elaborate Victorian Glasgow City Chambers, headquarters of Glasgow City Council. To the south and west are the shopping precincts of Argyle Street, Sauchiehall Street and Buchanan Street, the last featuring more upmarket retailers and winner of the Academy of Urbanism "Great Street Award" 2008. The collection of shops around these streets accumulate to become known as "The Style Mile".

The main shopping areas include Buchanan Street, Buchanan Galleries, linking Buchanan Street and Sauchiehall Street,  and the St. Enoch Centre linking Argyle Street and St Enoch Square), with the up-market Princes Square, which specifically features shops such as Ted Baker, Radley and Kurt Geiger.  Buchanan Galleries and other city centre locales were chosen as locations for the 2013 film Under the Skin directed by Jonathan Glazer. Although the Glasgow scenes were shot with hidden cameras, star Scarlett Johansson was spotted around town. The Italian Centre in Ingram Street also specialises in designer labels. Glasgow's retail portfolio forms the UK's second largest and most economically important retail sector after Central London.

The city centre is home to most of Glasgow's main cultural venues: the Glasgow Royal Concert Hall, Glasgow City Hall, Theatre Royal (performing home of Scottish Opera and Scottish Ballet), the Pavilion Theatre, the King's Theatre, Glasgow Film Theatre, Tron Theatre, Gallery of Modern Art (GoMA), Mitchell Library and Theatre, the Centre for Contemporary Arts, McLellan Galleries and the Lighthouse Museum of Architecture. The world's tallest cinema, the eighteen-screen Cineworld, is situated on Renfrew Street.
The city centre is also home to four of Glasgow's higher education institutions: the University of Strathclyde, the Royal Conservatoire of Scotland, Glasgow School of Art and Glasgow Caledonian University, and to the largest college in Britain the City of Glasgow College in Cathedral Street.

Merchant City

This is the commercial and part-residential district of the Merchant City, a name coined by the historian Charles Oakley in the 1960s. This had started as a residential district of the wealthy city merchants involved in international trade and the textile industries in the 18th and early 19th centuries, with their warehouses nearby, including the Tobacco Lords from whom many of the streets take their name. With its mercantile wealth, and continuing growth even before the Industrial Revolution, the city expanded by creating the New Town around George Square, soon followed by the New Town of Blythswood on Blythswood Hill which includes Blythswood Square. The original medieval centre around Glasgow Cross and the High Street was left behind.

Glasgow Cross, situated at the junction of High Street, leading up to Glasgow Cathedral, Gallowgate, Trongate and Saltmarket was the original centre of the city, symbolised by its Mercat cross. Glasgow Cross encompasses the Tolbooth Steeple, all that remains of the original Glasgow Tolbooth, which was demolished in 1921. Moving northward up High Street towards Rottenrow and Townhead lies the 15th century Glasgow Cathedral and the Provand's Lordship. Due to growing industrial pollution levels in the mid-to-late 19th century, the area fell out of favour with residents.

From the 1980s onwards, the Merchant City has been rejuvenated with luxury city centre flats and warehouse conversions. This regeneration has supported an increasing number of cafés and restaurants. The area is also home to a number of high end boutique style shops and some of Glasgow's most upmarket stores.

The Merchant City is one centre of Glasgow's growing "cultural quarter", based on King Street, the Saltmarket and Trongate, and at the heart of the annual Merchant City Festival. The area has supported a growth in art galleries, the origins of which can be found in the late 1980s when it attracted artist-led organisations that could afford the cheap rents required to operate in vacant manufacturing or retail spaces. The artistic and cultural potential of the Merchant City as a "cultural quarter" was harnessed by independent arts organisations and Glasgow City Council, and the recent development of Trongate 103, which houses galleries, workshops, artist studios and production spaces, is considered a major outcome of the continued partnership between both. The area also contains a number of theatres and concert venues, including the Tron Theatre, the Old Fruitmarket, the Trades Hall, St. Andrew's in the Square, Merchant Square, and the City Halls.

International Financial Services District

To the western edge of the city centre, occupying the areas of Blythswood Hill and Anderston, lies Glasgow's financial district, known officially as the International Financial Services District (IFSD), although often irreverently nicknamed by the contemporary press as the "square kilometre" or "Wall Street on Clyde". Since the late 1980s the construction of many modern office blocks and high rise developments have paved the way for the IFSD to become one of the UK's largest financial quarters. With a reputation as an established financial services centre, coupled with comprehensive support services, Glasgow continues to attract and grow new business.

Of the 10 largest general insurance companies in the UK, 8 have a base or head office in Glasgow – including Direct Line, Esure, AXA and Norwich Union. Key banking sector companies have also moved some of their services to commercial property in Glasgow – Resolution, JPMorgan Chase, Barclays Wealth, Tesco Personal Finance, Morgan Stanley, Lloyds Banking Group, Clydesdale Bank, BNP Paribas, HSBC, Santander and the Royal Bank of Scotland. The Ministry of Defence have several departments and Clydeport, the Glasgow Stock Exchange, Student Loans Company, Scottish Executive Enterprise, Transport and Lifelong Learning Department, BT Group, Scottish Friendly. Scottish Qualifications Authority and Scottish Enterprise also have their headquarters in the district. Royal Dutch Shell also have one of their six worldwide Shared Business Centres located in the IFSD. Hilton have a corporate office based in the area.

West End

Glasgow's West End grew firstly to and around Blythswood Square and Garnethill, extending then to Woodlands Hill and Great Western Road. It is a district of elegant townhouses and tenements with cafés, tea rooms, bars, boutiques, upmarket hotels, clubs and restaurants in the hinterland of Kelvingrove Park, the University of Glasgow, Glasgow Botanic Gardens and the Scottish Exhibition and Conference Centre, focused especially on the area's main thoroughfares of Argyle Street (Finnieston), Great Western Road and Byres Road. The area is popular with tourists and students.

The West End includes residential areas of Hillhead, Dowanhill, Kelvingrove, Kelvinside, Hyndland, Broomhill, Scotstoun, Jordanhill, Kelvindale, Anniesland
and Partick. The name is also increasingly being used to refer to any area to the west of Charing Cross. The West End is bisected by the River Kelvin, which flows from the Campsie Fells in the north and confluences with the River Clyde at Yorkhill Quay.

The spire of Sir George Gilbert Scott's Glasgow University main building (the second largest Gothic Revival building in Great Britain) is a major landmark, and can be seen from miles around, sitting atop Gilmorehill. The university itself is the fourth oldest in the English-speaking world. Much of the city's student population is based in the West End, adding to its cultural vibrancy.

The area is also home to the Kelvingrove Art Gallery and Museum, Hunterian Museum and Art Gallery, Kelvin Hall museums and research facilities, stores, and community sport.  Adjacent to the Kelvin Hall was the Museum of Transport, which reopened in 2010 after moving to a new location on a former dockland site at Glasgow Harbour where the River Kelvin flows into the Clyde. The new building is built to a design by Zaha Hadid. The West End Festival, one of Glasgow's largest festivals, is held annually in June.

Glasgow is the home of the SECC, Great Britain's largest exhibition and conference centre. On 30 September 2013, a major expansion of the SECC facilities at the former Queen's Dock by Foster and Partners officially opened – the 13,000-seat Hydro arena. Adjacent to the SECC at Queen's Dock is the Clydeside distillery, a Scotch whisky distillery that opened in 2017 in the former dock pump house.

East End

The East End extends from Glasgow Cross in the City Centre to the boundary with North and South Lanarkshire. It is home to the Glasgow Barrowland market, popularly known as "The Barras", Barrowland Ballroom, Glasgow Green, and Celtic Park, home of Celtic FC. Many of the original sandstone tenements remain in this district. The East End was once a major industrial centre, home to Sir William Arrol & Co., James Templeton & Co and William Beardmore and Company. A notable local employer continues to be the Wellpark Brewery, home of Tennent's Lager.

The Glasgow Necropolis Garden Cemetery was created by the Merchants House on a hill above the cathedral in 1831. Routes curve through the landscape uphill to the  statue of John Knox at the summit. There are two late 18th century tenements in Gallowgate. Dating from 1771 and 1780, both have been well restored. The construction of Charlotte Street was financed by David Dale, whose former scale can be gauged by the one remaining house, now run by the National Trust for Scotland. Further along Charlotte Street there stands a modern Gillespie, Kidd & Coia building of some note. Once a school, it has been converted into offices. Surrounding these buildings are a series of innovative housing developments conceived as "Homes for the Future", part of a project during the city's year as UK City of Architecture and Design in 1999.

East of Glasgow Cross is St Andrew's in the Square, the oldest post-Reformation church in Scotland, built in 1739–1757 and displaying a Presbyterian grandeur befitting the church of the city's wealthy tobacco merchants. Also close by is the more modest Episcopalian St Andrew's-by-the-Green, the oldest Episcopal church in Scotland. The Episcopalian St Andrew's was also known as the "Whistlin' Kirk" due to it being the first church after the Reformation to own an organ.

Overlooking Glasgow Green is the façade of Templeton On The Green, featuring vibrant polychromatic brickwork intended to evoke the Doge's Palace in Venice.

The extensive Tollcross Park was originally developed from the estate of James Dunlop, the owner of a local steelworks. His large baronial mansion was built in 1848 by David Bryce, which later housed the city's Children's Museum until the 1980s. Today, the mansion is a sheltered housing complex.

The new Scottish National Indoor Sports Arena, a modern replacement for the Kelvin Hall, is in Dalmarnock. The area was the site of the Athletes' Village for the 2014 Commonwealth Games, located adjacent to the new indoor sports arena.

The East End Healthy Living Centre (EEHLC) was established in mid-2005 at Crownpoint Road with Lottery Funding and City grants to serve community needs in the area. Now called the Glasgow Club Crownpoint Sports Complex, the centre provides service such as sports facilities, health advice, stress management, leisure and vocational classes. To the north of the East End lie the two large gasometers of Provan Gas Works, which stand overlooking Alexandra Park and a major interchange between the M8 and M80 motorways.

South Side

Glasgow's South Side sprawls out south of the Clyde. The adjoining urban area includes some of Greater Glasgow's most affluent suburban towns, such as Newton Mearns, Clarkston, and Giffnock, all of which are in East Renfrewshire, as well as Thorntonhall in South Lanarkshire. Newlands and Dumbreck are examples of high-value residential districts within the city boundaries. There are many areas containing a high concentration of sandstone tenements like Shawlands, which is considered the "Heart of the Southside", with other examples being Battlefield, Govanhill and Mount Florida. The large suburb of Pollokshields comprises both a quiet western part with undulating tree-lined boulevards lined with expensive villas, and a busier eastern part with a high-density grid of tenements and small shops. The south side also includes some post-war housing estates of various sizes such as Toryglen, Pollok, Castlemilk and Arden. The towns of Cambuslang and Rutherglen were included in the City of Glasgow district from 1975 to 1996, but are now in the South Lanarkshire council area.

Although predominantly residential, the area does have several notable public buildings including, Charles Rennie Mackintosh's Scotland Street School Museum and House for an Art Lover; the Burrell Collection in Pollok Country Park; Alexander "Greek" Thomson's Holmwood House villa; the National Football Stadium Hampden Park in Mount Florida (home of Queens Park FC) and Ibrox Stadium (home of Rangers FC).

The former docklands site at Pacific Quay on the south bank of the River Clyde, opposite the SECC, is the site of the Glasgow Science Centre and the headquarters of BBC Scotland and STV Group (owner of STV), in a new purpose built digital media campus.

In addition, several new bridges spanning the River Clyde have been built, including the Clyde Arc known by locals as the Squinty Bridge at Pacific Quay and others at Tradeston and Springfield Quay.

The South Side also includes many public parks, including Linn Park, Queen's Park, and Bellahouston Park and several golf clubs, including the championship course at Haggs Castle. The South Side is also home to the large Pollok Country Park, which was awarded the accolade of Europe's Best Park 2008. The southside also directly borders Rouken Glen Park in neighbouring Giffnock. Pollok Park is Glasgow's largest park and until the early 2000s was the only country park in the city's boundary. In the early 2000s the Dams to Darnley Country Park was designated, although half of the park is in East Renfrewshire. As of 2021 the facilities at the still new park are quite lacking.

Govan is a district and former burgh in the south-western part of the city. It is situated on the south bank of the River Clyde, opposite Partick. It was an administratively independent Police Burgh from 1864 until it was incorporated into the expanding city of Glasgow in 1912. Govan has a legacy as an engineering and shipbuilding centre of international repute and is home to one of two BAE Systems Surface Ships shipyards on the River Clyde and the precision engineering firm, Thales Optronics. It is also home to the Queen Elizabeth University Hospital, one of the largest hospitals in the country, and the maintenance depot for the Glasgow Subway system. The wider Govan area includes the districts of Ibrox, Cessnock, Kinning Park and Kingston.

North Glasgow

North Glasgow extends out from the north of the city centre towards the affluent suburbs of Bearsden, Milngavie and Bishopbriggs in East Dunbartonshire and Clydebank in West Dunbartonshire. The area also contains some of the city's poorest residential areas.

This has led to large-scale redevelopment of much of the poorer housing stock in north Glasgow, and the wider regeneration of many areas, such as Ruchill, which have been transformed; many run-down tenements have now been refurbished or replaced by modern housing estates. Much of the housing stock in north Glasgow is rented social housing, with a high proportion of high-rise tower blocks, managed by the North Glasgow Housing Association trading as NG Homes and Glasgow Housing Association.

Maryhill consists of well maintained traditional sandstone tenements. Although historically a working class area, its borders with the upmarket West End of the city mean that it is relatively wealthy compared to the rest of the north of the city, containing affluent areas such as Maryhill Park and North Kelvinside. Maryhill is also the location of Firhill Stadium, home of Partick Thistle F.C. since 1909. The junior team, Maryhill F.C. are also located in this part of north Glasgow.

The Forth and Clyde Canal passes through this part of the city, and at one stage formed a vital part of the local economy. It was for many years polluted and largely unused after the decline of heavy industry, but recent efforts to regenerate and re-open the canal to navigation have seen it rejuvenated, including art campuses at Port Dundas.

Sighthill was home to Scotland's largest asylum seeker community but the area is now regenerated as part of the Youth Olympic Games bid.

A huge part of the economic life of Glasgow was once located in Springburn, where the Saracen Foundry, engineering works of firms like Charles Tennant and locomotive workshops employed many Glaswegians. Indeed, Glasgow dominated this type of manufacturing, with 25% of all the world's locomotives being built in the area at one stage. It was home to the headquarters of the North British Locomotive Company. Today part of the Glasgow Works continues in use as a railway maintenance facility, all that is left of the industry in Springburn. It is proposed for closure in 2019.

Culture

The city has many amenities for a wide range of cultural activities, from curling to opera and ballet and from football to art appreciation; it also has a large selection of museums that include those devoted to transport, religion, and modern art. Many of the city's cultural sites were celebrated in 1990 when Glasgow was designated European Capital of Culture.

The city's principal municipal library, the Mitchell Library, has grown into one of the largest public reference libraries in Europe, currently housing some 1.3 million books, an extensive collection of newspapers and thousands of photographs and maps.
Of academic libraries, Glasgow University Library started in the 15th century and is one of the oldest and largest libraries in Europe, with unique and distinctive collections of international status.

Most of Scotland's national arts organisations are based in Glasgow, including Scottish Opera, Scottish Ballet, National Theatre of Scotland, Royal Scottish National Orchestra, BBC Scottish Symphony Orchestra and Scottish Youth Theatre.

Glasgow has its own "Poet Laureate", a post created in 1999 for Edwin Morgan and occupied by Liz Lochhead from 2005 until 2011, when she stood down to take up the position of Scots Makar. Jim Carruth was appointed to the position of Poet Laureate for Glasgow in 2014 as part of the 2014 Commonwealth Games legacy.

In 2013, PETA declared Glasgow to be the most vegan-friendly city in the UK.

Recreation

Glasgow is home to a variety of theatres including the King's Theatre, the Theatre Royal and the Citizens Theatre and is home to many museums and art galleries, the largest and most famous being the Kelvingrove Art Gallery and Museum, the Hunterian Museum and Art Gallery, the Gallery of Modern Art (GoMA) and the Burrell Collection. Most of the museums and galleries in Glasgow are publicly owned and free to enter.

The city has hosted many exhibitions over the years, including The Glasgow Garden Festival in 1988,  being the UK City of Architecture 1999, European Capital of Culture 1990, National City of Sport 1995–1999 and European Capital of Sport 2003. Glasgow has also hosted the National Mòd no less than twelve times since 1895.

In addition, unlike the older and larger Edinburgh Festival (where all Edinburgh's main festivals occur in the last three weeks of August), Glasgow's festivals fill the calendar. Festivals include the Glasgow International Comedy Festival, Glasgow International Festival of Visual Art, Glasgow International Jazz Festival, Celtic Connections, Glasgow Fair, Glasgow Film Festival, West End Festival, Merchant City Festival, Glasgay, and the World Pipe Band Championships.

Music scene

The city is home to numerous orchestras, ensembles and bands including those of Scottish Opera, Scottish Ballet, Royal Scottish National Orchestra, BBC Scottish Symphony Orchestra and related to the Royal Conservatoire of Scotland, the National Youth Orchestra of Scotland and the Universities and Colleges. Choirs of all type are well supported.
Glasgow has many live music venues, pubs, and clubs. Some of the city's more well-known venues include the Glasgow Royal Concert Hall, The OVO Hydro, the SECC, Glasgow Cathouse, The Art School, King Tut's Wah Wah Hut (where Oasis were spotted and signed by Glaswegian record mogul Alan McGee), the Queen Margaret Union (who have Kurt Cobain's footprint locked in a safe), the Barrowland, a ballroom converted into a live music venue as well as The Garage, which is the largest nightclub in Scotland. More recent mid-sized venues include ABC, destroyed in the art school fire of 15 June 2018, and the O2 Academy, which play host to a similar range of acts. There are also a large number of smaller venues and bars, which host many local and touring musicians, including Stereo, 13th Note and Nice N Sleazy. Most recent recipient of the SLTN Music Pub of the Year award was Bar Bloc, awarded in November 2011. In 2010, Glasgow was named the UK's fourth "most musical" city by PRS for Music. Glasgow is also the "most mentioned city in the UK" in song titles, outside London according, to a chart produced by PRS for music, with 119, ahead of closest rivals Edinburgh who received 95 mentions

Since the 1980s, the success of bands such as The Blue Nile, Gun, Simple Minds, Del Amitri, Texas, Hipsway, Love & Money, Idlewild, Deacon Blue, Orange Juice, Lloyd Cole and the Commotions, Teenage Fanclub, Belle and Sebastian, Camera Obscura, Franz Ferdinand, Mogwai, Travis, and Primal Scream has significantly boosted the profile of the Glasgow music scene, prompting Time magazine to liken Glasgow to Detroit during its 1960s Motown heyday. More recent successes include The Fratellis, Chvrches, Rustie, Vukovi, Glasvegas and Twin Atlantic. The city of Glasgow was appointed a UNESCO City of Music on 20 August 2008 as part of the Creative Cities Network.

Glasgow's contemporary dance music scene has been spearheaded by Slam, and their record label Soma Quality Recordings, with their Pressure club nights attracting DJs and clubbers from around the world, which was previously held at The Arches but following that venue's closure due to claims of unsafe level of drug use has moved to Sub Club.

The MOBO Awards were held at the SECC on 30 September 2009, making Glasgow the first out-of-London city to host the event since its launch in 1995. On 9 November 2014, Glasgow hosted the 2014 MTV Europe Music Awards at The OVO Hydro, it was the second time Scotland hosted the show since 2003 in Edinburgh and overall the fifth time that the United Kingdom has hosted the show since 2011 in Belfast, Northern Ireland. The event was hosted by Nicki Minaj and featured performances from Ariana Grande, Enrique Iglesias, Ed Sheeran, U2 and Slash.

Media

There have been hundreds of films made about Glasgow or in Glasgow.

Both BBC Scotland and STV have their headquarters in Glasgow. Television programs filmed in Glasgow include Rab C. Nesbitt, Taggart, Tutti Frutti, High Times, River City, City Lights, Chewin' the Fat, Still Game, Limmy's Show and Lovesick. Most recently the long-running series Question Time and the early evening quiz programme Eggheads moved its production base to the city. Most National Lottery game shows are also filmed in Glasgow. children's game show Copycats is filmed there, and the Irish/UK programme Mrs. Brown's Boys is filmed at BBC Scotland.

The Scottish press publishes various newspapers in the city such as The Evening Times , The Herald, The Sunday Herald, the Sunday Mail and the Daily Record. Scottish editions of Trinity Mirror and News International titles are printed in the city. STV Group is a Glasgow-based media conglomerate with interests in television, and publishing advertising. STV Group owns and operates both Scottish ITV franchises (Central Scotland and Grampian), both branded STV. Glasgow also had its own television channel, STV Glasgow, which launched in June 2014, which also shows some of Glasgow's own programs filmed at the STV headquarters in Glasgow. Shows included The Riverside Show, Scottish Kitchen, City Safari, Football Show and Live at Five. STV Glasgow merged with STV Edinburgh to form STV2 in April 2017 which eventually closed in June 2018.

Various radio stations are also located in Glasgow. BBC Radio Scotland, the national radio broadcaster for Scotland, is located in the BBC's Glasgow headquarters alongside its Gaelic-language sister station, which is also based in Stornoway. Bauer Radio owns the principal commercial radio stations in Glasgow: Clyde 1 and Clyde 2, which can reach over 2.3 million listeners. In 2004, STV Group plc (then known as SMG plc) sold its 27.8% stake in Scottish Radio Holdings to the broadcasting group EMAP for £90.5 million. Other stations broadcasting from Glasgow include Smooth Scotland, Heart Scotland, which are owned by Global. Global Radio's Central Scotland radio station Capital Scotland also broadcast from studios in Glasgow. Nation Radio Scotland, owned by Nation Broadcasting, also broadcasts from the city. The city has a strong community radio sector, including Celtic Music Radio, Subcity Radio, Radio Magnetic, Sunny Govan Radio, AWAZ FM and Insight Radio.

Religion

Glasgow is a city of significant religious diversity. The Church of Scotland and the Roman Catholic Church are the two largest Christian denominations in the city. There are 147 congregations in the Church of Scotland's Presbytery of Glasgow (of which 104 are within the city boundaries, the other 43 being in adjacent areas). Within the city boundaries there are 65 parishes of the Roman Catholic Archdiocese of Glasgow and four parishes of the Diocese of Motherwell. The city has four Christian cathedrals: Glasgow Cathedral, of the Church of Scotland; St Andrew's Cathedral, of the Roman Catholic Church; St Mary's Cathedral, of the Scottish Episcopal Church, and St Luke's Cathedral, of the Greek Orthodox Church. The Baptist Church and Salvation Army are well represented.

The Protestant churches are the largest in number, including Baptist, Episcopalian, Methodist and Presbyterian. 32% of the population follow the Protestant Church of Scotland whilst 29% following the Roman Catholic Church, according to the 2001 census (Christians overall form 65%). Much of the city's Roman Catholic population are those of Irish ancestry. The divisions between the two denominations and their respective communities play a major part in sectarianism in Glasgow, in a similar nature to that of Northern Ireland, although not segregated territorially as in Belfast.

Biblical unitarians are represented by three Christadelphian ecclesias, referred to geographically, as "South", "Central" and "Kelvin".

The Sikh community is served by four Gurdwaras. Two are situated in the West End (Central Gurdwara Singh Sabha in Sandyford and Guru Nanak Sikh Temple in Kelvinbridge) and two in the Southside area of Pollokshields (Guru Granth Sahib Gurdwara and Sri Guru Tegh Bahadur Gurdwara). In 2013, Scotland's first purpose-built Gurdwara opened in a massive opening ceremony. Built at a cost of £3.8M, it can hold 1,500 worshippers. Central Gurdwara is currently constructing a new building in the city. There are almost 10,000 Sikhs in Scotland and the majority live in Glasgow.

Glasgow Central Mosque in the Gorbals district is the largest mosque in Scotland and, along with twelve other mosques in the city, caters for the city's Muslim population, estimated to number 33,000.

Glasgow also has a Hindu mandir.

Glasgow has seven synagogues, including the Romanesque-revival Garnethill Synagogue in the city centre. Glasgow currently has the seventh largest Jewish population in the United Kingdom after London, Manchester, Leeds, Gateshead, Brighton and Bournemouth but once had a Jewish population second only to London, estimated at 20,000 in the Gorbals alone.

In 1993, the St Mungo Museum of Religious Life and Art opened in Glasgow. It is believed to be the only public museum to examine all the world's major religious faiths.

Language
Glasgow is Scotland's main locus of Gaelic language use outside the Highlands and Islands. In 2011, 5,878 residents of the city over age 3 spoke Gaelic, amounting to 1.0% of the population. Of Scotland's 25 largest cities and towns, only Inverness, the unofficial capital of the Highlands, has a higher percentage of Gaelic speakers. In the Greater Glasgow area there were 8,899 Gaelic-speakers, amounting to 0.8% of the population. Both the Gaelic language television station BBC Alba and the Gaelic language radio station BBC Radio nan Gàidheal have studios in Glasgow, their only locations outside the Highlands and Islands.

Architecture

Very little of medieval Glasgow remains; the two main landmarks from this period being the 15th-century Provand's Lordship and 13th-century St. Mungo's Cathedral, although the original medieval street plan (along with many of the street names) on the eastern side of the city centre has largely survived intact. Also in the 15th century began the building of Cathcart Castle, completed c. 1450 with an impressive view over the landscape in all directions. It was at this castle Mary Queen of Scots supposedly spent the night before her defeat at the Battle of Langside in May 1568. The castle was demolished in 1980 for safety reasons. The vast majority of the central city area as seen today dates from the 19th century. As a result, Glasgow has an impressive heritage of Victorian architecture: the Glasgow City Chambers; the main building of the University of Glasgow, designed by Sir George Gilbert Scott; and the Kelvingrove Art Gallery and Museum, designed by Sir John W. Simpson, are notable examples.

The city is notable for architecture designed by the Glasgow School, the most notable exponent of that style being Charles Rennie Mackintosh. Mackintosh was an architect and designer in the Arts and Crafts Movement and the main exponent of Art Nouveau in the United Kingdom, designing numerous noted Glasgow buildings such as the Glasgow School of Art, Willow Tearooms and the Scotland Street School Museum. A hidden gem of Glasgow, also designed by Mackintosh, is the Queen's Cross Church, the only church by the renowned artist to be built.

Another architect who has had an enduring impact on the city's appearance is Alexander Thomson, with notable examples including the Holmwood House villa, and likewise Sir John James Burnet, awarded the R.I.B.A.'s Royal Gold Medal for his lifetime's service to architecture. The buildings reflect the wealth and self-confidence of the residents of the "Second City of the Empire". Glasgow generated immense wealth from trade and the industries that developed from the Industrial Revolution. The shipyards, marine engineering, steel making, and heavy industry all contributed to the growth of the city.

Many of the city's most impressive buildings were built with red or blond sandstone, but during the industrial era those colours disappeared under a pervasive black layer of soot and pollutants from the furnaces, until the Clean Air Act was introduced in 1956. Such areas include the Central Area, Dennistoun, the West End, Pollokshields – the first major planned garden suburb in Britain – Newlands and the village of Carmunnock.

Modern buildings in Glasgow include the Glasgow Royal Concert Hall, and along the banks of the Clyde are the Glasgow Science Centre, The OVO Hydro and the Scottish Exhibition and Conference Centre, whose Clyde Auditorium was designed by Sir Norman Foster, and is colloquially known as the "Armadillo". In 2006 Zaha Hadid won a competition to design the new Museum of Transport. Hadid's museum opened on the waterfront in 2011 and has been renamed the Riverside Museum to reflect the change in location and to celebrate Glasgow's rich industrial heritage stemming from the Clyde.

Glasgow's impressive historical and modern architectural traditions were celebrated in 1999 when the city was designated UK City of Architecture and Design, winning the accolade over Liverpool and Edinburgh.

Economy

Glasgow has the largest economy in Scotland and is at the hub of the metropolitan area of West Central Scotland. The city itself sustains more than 410,000 jobs in over 12,000 companies. Over 153,000 jobs were created in the city between 2000 and 2005 – a growth rate of 32%. Glasgow's annual economic growth rate of 4.4% is now second only to that of London. In 2005, over 17,000 new jobs were created, and 2006 saw private-sector investment in the city reaching £4.2 billion, an increase of 22% in a single year. 55% of the residents in the Greater Glasgow area commute to the city every day. Once dominant export orientated manufacturing industries such as shipbuilding and other heavy engineering have been gradually replaced in importance by more diversified forms of economic activity, although major manufacturing firms continue to be headquartered in the city, such as Aggreko, Weir Group, Clyde Blowers, Howden, Linn Products, Firebrand Games, William Grant & Sons, Whyte and Mackay, The Edrington Group, British Polar Engines and Albion Motors.

Glasgow was once one of the most significant cities in the UK for manufacturing, which generated a great deal of the city's wealth; the most prominent industry being shipbuilding based on the River Clyde. Although Glasgow owed much of its economic growth to the shipbuilding industry, which still continues today in the form of Ferguson Marine and BAE Systems Maritime - Naval Ships' two shipyards, the city has its roots in the tobacco trade and is noted to have "risen from its medieval slumber" from trade in tobacco, pioneered by figures such as John Glassford. The city was also noted for its locomotive construction industryled by firms such as the North British Locomotive Companywhich grew during the 19th century before entering a decline in the 1960s.

Whilst manufacturing has declined, Glasgow's economy has seen significant relative growth of tertiary sector industries such as financial and business services (centred around the International Financial Services District on the Broomielaw, once a stretch of riverside warehouses replaced by modern office blocks), communications, biosciences, creative industries, healthcare, higher education, retail and tourism. Glasgow is now the second most popular foreign tourist destination in Scotland (fifth in the UK) and offers Scotland's largest retail centre.

Between 1998 and 2001, the city's financial services sector grew at a rate of 30%, making considerable gains on Edinburgh, which has historically been the centre of the Scottish financial sector. Glasgow is now one of Europe's sixteen largest financial centres, with a growing number of Blue chip financial sector companies establishing significant operations or headquarters in the city.

The 1990s and first decade of the 21st century saw substantial growth in the number of call centres based in Glasgow. In 2007 roughly 20,000 people, a third of all call centre employees in Scotland, were employed by Glasgow call centres. This growth and its high use of recruitment agencies to hire graduates as temporary workers has led to accusations of exploitative practices such as long hours, poor pay and lack of job security by the TUC and other union bodies.

The city's main manufacturing industries include companies involved in; shipbuilding, engineering, construction, brewing and distilling, printing and publishing, chemicals and textiles as well as newer growth sectors such as optoelectronics, software development and biotechnology. Glasgow forms the western part of the Silicon Glen high tech sector of Scotland with consumer electronics companies such as RHA Technologies headquartered.

Transport

Public transport

Glasgow has a large urban transport system, mostly managed by the Strathclyde Partnership for Transport (SPT).

The city has many bus services; since bus deregulation almost all are provided by private operators, though SPT part-funds some services. The principal bus operators within the city are: First Glasgow, McGill's Bus Services, Stagecoach West Scotland and Glasgow Citybus. The main bus terminal in the city is Buchanan bus station.

Glasgow has the most extensive urban rail network in the UK outside London, with rail services travelling to a large part of the West of Scotland. Most lines were electrified under British Rail. All trains running within Scotland, including the local Glasgow trains, are operated by ScotRail, which is owned by the Scottish Government. Central station and Queen Street station are the two main railway terminals. Glasgow Central is also the terminus for suburban services on the south side of Glasgow, Ayrshire and Inverclyde, as well as being served by the cross city link from Dalmuir to Motherwell. Most other services within Scotland – the main line to Edinburgh, plus services to Aberdeen, Dundee, Inverness and the Western Highlands – operate from Queen Street station.

The city's suburban network is currently divided by the River Clyde and the Crossrail Glasgow initiative has been proposed to link them; it is currently awaiting funding from the Scottish Government. The city is linked to Edinburgh by four direct railway links. In addition to the suburban rail network, SPT operates the Glasgow Subway. The Subway is the United Kingdom's only completely underground metro system and is generally recognised as the world's third oldest underground railway after the London Underground and the Budapest Metro. Both railway and subway stations have a number of park and ride facilities.

As part of the wider regeneration along the banks of the River Clyde, a bus rapid transit system called Clyde Fastlink is operational between Glasgow City Centre to the Queen Elizabeth University Hospital.

Shipping
Global-ship-management is carried out by maritime and logistics firms in Glasgow, in client companies employing over 100,000 seafarers. This reflects maritime skills over many decades and the training and education of deck officers and marine engineers from around the world at the City of Glasgow College, Nautical Campus, from which graduate around one third of all such graduates in the United Kingdom.

The main operational dock within Glasgow operated by Clydeport is the King George V Dock, near Braehead. Since the advent of containerisation, most other facilities, such as Hunterston Terminal, are located in the deep waters of the Firth of Clyde, which together handle some 7.5 million tonnes of cargo each year. Longer distant commercial sea shipping from Glasgow occurs regularly to many European destinations, including Mediterranean and Baltic ports via passage through the Sea of the Hebrides.

Leisure and tourist sailing is important, at marinas and towns of the Clyde, including the PS Waverley, the world's last operational seagoing paddle-steamer.

Roads
 The main M8 motorway passes around the city centre and connects with the M77, M74, M73 and M80 motorways, all of which pass within the city's boundaries. The A82 connects Glasgow to Argyll and the western Highlands. The M74 runs directly south towards Carlisle.

Other strategic roads in the city include the East End Regeneration Route, which provides easier access to areas of the East End, linking the M8 to the extended M74.

Airports

There are three international airports within 45 minutes travel of the city centre, as well as a centrally located seaplane terminal. Two airports are dedicated to Glasgow, and Edinburgh International airport, situated on the west side of Edinburgh, is not far from Glasgow. These airports are Glasgow Airport (GLA) ( west of the city centre) in Renfrewshire, Glasgow Prestwick Airport (PIK) ( southwest) in Ayrshire, Edinburgh Airport (EDI), ( east) in Edinburgh and Glasgow Seaplane Terminal, by the Glasgow Science Centre on the River Clyde. There are also several smaller, domestic and private airports around the city. There is a heliport, Glasgow City Heliport, located at Stobcross Quay on the banks of the Clyde.

All of the international airports are easily accessible by public transport, with GLA and EDI directly linked by a bus routes from the main bus station and a direct rail connection to PIK from Glasgow Central Station. A series of proposals to provide a direct rail link to Glasgow International Airport have ended unsuccessfully, beginning with the Glasgow Airport Rail Link in 2009. As of 2019, local authorities have approved plans for a "Glasgow Metro", including a connection to the International Airport.

Housing

Glasgow is known for its tenements; the red and blond sandstone buildings are some of the most recognisable features of the city. These were the most popular form of housing in 19th- and 20th-century Glasgow, and remain the most common form of dwelling in Glasgow today. Tenements are commonly bought by a wide range of social types and are favoured for their large rooms, high ceilings and original period features. The Hyndland area of Glasgow became the first tenement conservation area in the UK and includes some tenement houses with as many as six bedrooms.

Like many cities in the UK, Glasgow witnessed the construction of high-rise housing in tower blocks in the 1960s, along with large overspill estates on the periphery of the city, in areas like Pollok, Nitshill, Castlemilk, Easterhouse, Milton and Drumchapel. These were built to replace the decaying inner-city tenement buildings originally built for workers who migrated from the surrounding countryside, the Highlands, and the rest of the United Kingdom, particularly Ireland, to feed the local demand for labour. The massive demand at that time outstripped the pace of new building, and many originally fine tenements often became overcrowded and unsanitary. Many degenerated into infamous slums, such as the Gorbals.

Efforts to improve this housing situation, most successfully with the City Improvement Trust in the late 19th century, cleared the slums of the old town areas such as the Trongate, High Street and Glasgow Cross. Subsequent urban renewal initiatives, such as those motivated by the Bruce Report, entailed the comprehensive demolition of slum tenement areas, the development of new towns on the periphery of the city, and the construction of tower blocks.

The policy of tenement demolition is now considered to have been short-sighted, wasteful and largely unsuccessful. Many of Glasgow's worst tenements were refurbished into desirable accommodation in the 1970s and 1980s and the policy of demolition is considered to have destroyed many fine examples of a "universally admired architectural" style. The Glasgow Housing Association took ownership of the housing stock from the city council on 7 March 2003, and has begun a £96 million clearance and demolition programme to clear and demolish many of the high-rise flats.

Healthcare

Medical care is mainly provided by NHS Scotland and is directly administered by NHS Greater Glasgow and Clyde.

Major hospitals, including those with Accident & Emergency provision, are: the Western Infirmary, Gartnavel General Hospital, Glasgow Royal Infirmary and the Dental Hospital in the city Centre, Stobhill Hospital in the North and the Victoria Infirmary and Queen Elizabeth University Hospital in the South Side. Gartnavel Royal Hospital and The Priory are the two major psychiatric hospitals based in Glasgow.

The Queen Elizabeth University Hospital (QEUH) Campus is a 1,677-bed acute hospital located in Govan in the south-west of Glasgow. The hospital is built on the site of the former Southern General Hospital and opened at the end of April 2015. The hospital comprises a newly built 1,109-bed adult hospital, a 256-bed children's hospital and two major A&E departments, one for adults and one for children in addition to buildings retained from the former hospital. The QEUH is the Regional Major Trauma Centre for the west of Scotland and is also the largest hospital campus in Europe.

There is also an emergency telephone service provided by NHS 24 and 24-hour access to general practitioners through out-of-hours centres. Paramedic services are provided by the Scottish Ambulance Service and supported by voluntary bodies like the St. Andrew's Ambulance Association. A strong teaching tradition is maintained between the city's main hospitals and the University of Glasgow Medical School.

All pharmacies provide a wide range of services including minor ailment advice, emergency hormonal contraception, public health advice, some provide oxygen and needle exchange.

There are private clinics and hospitals at the Nuffield in the west end and Ross Hall in the south side of the city.

Education

Glasgow is a major centre of higher and academic research, with the following universities and colleges within  of the city centre:
 University of Glasgow
 University of Strathclyde
 Glasgow Caledonian University
 University of the West of Scotland
 The Glasgow School of Art
 Royal Conservatoire of Scotland
 City of Glasgow College
 Glasgow Clyde College
 Glasgow Kelvin College
 West College Scotland

In 2011 Glasgow had 53,470 full-time students aged 18–74 resident in the city during term time, more than any other city in Scotland and the fifth-highest number in the United Kingdom outside London. The majority of those who live away from home reside in Shawlands, Dennistoun and the West End of the city.

The City Council operates 29 secondary schools, 149 primary schools and three specialist schools – the Dance School of Scotland, Glasgow School of Sport and the Glasgow Gaelic School (Sgoil Ghàidhlig Ghlaschu), the only secondary school in Scotland to teach exclusively in Gaelic. Outdoor Education facilities are provided by the city council at the Blairvadach Centre, near Helensburgh. Jordanhill School is operated directly by the Scottish Government. Glasgow also has a number of Independent schools, including The High School of Glasgow, founded in 1124 and the oldest school in Scotland; Hutchesons' Grammar School, founded in 1639 and one of the oldest school institutions in Britain; and others such as Craigholme School (closed 2020), Glasgow Academy, Kelvinside Academy and St. Aloysius' College. Glasgow is part of the UNESCO Global Network of Learning Cities.

Sport

Football

The world's first international football match was held in 1872 at the West of Scotland Cricket Club's Hamilton Crescent ground in the Partick area of the city. The match, between Scotland and England finished 0–0.

Glasgow was the first city (since joined by Liverpool in 1985, Madrid in 1986, 2014, 2016 and 2018, Milan in 1994 and London in 2019) to have had two football teams in European finals in the same season: in 1967, Celtic competed in the European Cup final with rivals Rangers competing in the Cup Winners' Cup final. Rangers were the first football club from the United Kingdom to reach a European final, doing so in 1961. They have also won more domestic top-tier league titles than any other football club in the world (currently 55). Celtic were the first non-Latin club to win the European Cup, under the management of Jock Stein in 1967, before Manchester United the following year. Celtic also went on to reach another European Cup Final in 1970, losing to Feyenoord, and also the final of the UEFA Cup in 2003, where they lost an enthralling match which finished 3–2 to Portuguese club Porto. Rangers also reached the final of the same competition in 2008, where they lost to Zenit Saint Petersburg of Russia.

Hampden Park, which is Scotland's national football stadium, holds the European record for attendance at a football match: 149,547 saw Scotland beat England 3–1 in 1937, in the days before leading British stadia became all-seated. Hampden Park has hosted the final of the UEFA Champions League on three occasions, most recently in 2002 and hosted the UEFA Cup Final in 2007. Celtic Park (60,411 seats) is located in the east end of Glasgow, and Ibrox Stadium (50,817 seats) on the south side.

Glasgow has four professional football clubs, who all play in the SPFL: Celtic, Rangers, Partick Thistle, and Queen's Park (after their move from amateur status in November 2019). Prior to this, Glasgow had two other professional teams: Clyde (now playing in Hamilton) and Third Lanark (liquidated in 1967), plus four others active in the league in the 19th century: Thistle, Cowlairs, Northern and Linthouse. There are a number of West of Scotland Football League clubs within the city as well, such as Pollok, Maryhill, Benburb, Ashfield, Glasgow Perthshire F.C., Glasgow United (formerly Shettleston Juniors), and Petershill, plus numerous amateur teams.

The history of football in the city, as well as the status of the Old Firm, attracts many visitors to football matches in the city throughout the season. The Scottish Football Association, the national governing body, and the Scottish Football Museum are based in Glasgow, as are the Scottish Professional Football League, Scottish Junior Football Association and Scottish Amateur Football Association. The Glasgow Cup was a once popular tournament, which was competed for by Rangers, Celtic, Clyde, Partick Thistle and Queen's Park. The competition is now played for by the youth sides of the five teams.

Glasgow is also home to six women's football teams. Currently, Glasgow City are the champions of the Scottish Women's Premier League. Other local teams include Glasgow Girls and the women's sections of the men's clubs: Celtic and Rangers play in the top division.

Rugby union
Glasgow has a professional rugby union club, the Glasgow Warriors, which plays in the European Rugby Champions Cup and Pro14 alongside teams from Scotland, Ireland, Wales, Italy and South Africa. The Warriors current home is Scotstoun Stadium and has been since 2012, previously they played at Firhill Stadium. They have won the Melrose 7s in both 2014 and 2015 and were also crowned champions of the Pro12 at the end of the 2014/15 season after beating Irish side Munster in Belfast.

In the Scottish League, Glasgow Hawks RFC was formed in 1997 by the merger of two of Glasgow's oldest clubs: Glasgow Academicals and Glasgow High Kelvinside (GHK). Despite the merger, the second division teams of Glasgow Academicals and Glasgow High Kelvinside re-entered the Scottish rugby league in 1998.

South of Glasgow, in East Renfrewshire, in the suburb of Giffnock, is based another of Glasgow area's most prominent clubs Glasgow Hutchesons Aloysians RFC (GHA). GHA was formed in 2002 with the merger of two of Glasgow's leading clubs at the time, Glasgow Southern RFC and Hutchesons Aloysians RFC.

Cartha Queen's Park play at Dumbreck, within the city.

Glasgow was also home to one of the oldest rugby clubs in Scotland, West of Scotland F.C., which was formed in 1865, and was a founding member of the Scottish Rugby Union. The club was originally based in Partick at Hamilton Crescent but is now based outside the city, at Burnbrae, Milngavie in East Dunbartonshire.

Rugby league
The Easterhouse Panthers based in the East End of Glasgow are a rugby league team who play in the Rugby League Conference Scotland Division.

Ice hockey
From 1966 to 1986, the Glasgow Dynamos played at Crossmyloof Ice Rink. Since October 2010 a team called the Glasgow Clan based in the nearby Braehead Arena in Renfrewshire has played in the professional Elite Ice Hockey League alongside two other Scottish teams, the Fife Flyers and the Dundee Stars.

Swimming
The Arlington Baths Club was founded in 1870. It is situated in the Woodlands area of the city and is still in use today. It is believed the club's first Baths Master William Wilson invented water polo at the club. The Arlington inspired other Swimming Clubs and the Western Baths, which opened in 1876, is also still in existence in nearby Hillhead.

Basketball
Glasgow hosts Scotland's only professional basketball team, the Caledonia Gladiators, who compete in the British Basketball League. Previously based in Renfrewshire's Braehead Arena and the 1,200-seat Kelvin Hall, the team has been based at the Emirates Arena since the 2012/13 season.

Other sports

Major international sporting arenas include the Kelvin Hall and Scotstoun Sports Centre. In 2003 the National Academy for Badminton was completed in Scotstoun. In 2003, Glasgow was also given the title of European Capital of Sport.

Glasgow is also host to many cricket clubs including Clydesdale Cricket Club who have been title winners for the Scottish Cup many times. This club also acted as a neutral venue for a One Day International match between India and Pakistan in 2007, but due to bad weather it was called off.

Smaller sporting facilities include an abundance of outdoor playing fields, as well as golf clubs such as Haggs Castle and artificial ski slopes. Between 1998 and 2004, the Scottish Claymores American football team played some or all of their home games each season at Hampden Park and the venue also hosted World Bowl XI.

Glasgow Green and the Gorbals are home to a number of rowing clubs, some with open membership the rest belonging to universities or schools. Historically, rowing races on the River Clyde here attracted huge crowds of spectators to watch regattas in the late 19th century and early 20th century; before football caught the public imagination. Two of Glasgow's rowing clubs separately claim that it was their members who were among the founders of Rangers Football Club.

Motorcycle speedway racing was first introduced to Glasgow in 1928 and is currently staged at Ashfield Stadium in the North of the city. The home club, Glasgow Tigers, compete in the SGB Championship, the second tier of motorcycle speedway in Britain.

Glasgow is also one of five places in Scotland that hosts the final of the Scottish Cup of Shinty, better known as the Camanachd Cup. This is usually held at Old Anniesland. Once home to numerous Shinty clubs, there is now only one senior club in Glasgow, Glasgow Mid-Argyll.

Glasgow bid to host the 2018 Summer Youth Olympics but lost to Buenos Aires in the 4 July 2013 vote.

Glasgow was the host of the 2018 European Sports Championships along with Berlin (hosts of the 2018 European Athletics Championships).

2014 Commonwealth Games

On 9 November 2007, Glasgow was selected to be the host city of the 2014 Commonwealth Games. The games were held at a number of existing and newly constructed sporting venues across the city, including a refurbished Hampden Park, Kelvingrove Park, Kelvin Hall, and the OVO Hydro at the SECC. The opening ceremony was held at Celtic Park. 2014 was the third time the Games have been held in Scotland.

Major incidents and tragedies

 5 April 1902 – 1902 Ibrox disaster – 25 spectators died and more than 500 were injured when a new wooden stand at the Ibrox Park stadium collapsed during an England–Scotland match.
 1960s/1970s – Many perished at three major blazes: the Cheapside Street whisky bond fire in Cheapside Street, Anderston (1960, 19 killed); the James Watt Street fire (1968, 22 killed); and the Kilbirnie Street fire (1972, seven killed).
 2 January 1971 – 1971 Ibrox disaster – 66 people were killed in a crush, as supporters attempted to vacate the stadium.
 11 May 2004 – Stockline Plastics factory explosion – The ICL Plastics factory (commonly referred to as Stockline Plastics factory), in the Woodside district of Glasgow, exploded. Nine people were killed, including two company directors, and 33 injured – 15 seriously. The four-storey building was largely destroyed.
 30 June 2007 – 2007 Glasgow International Airport attack – Two jihadist terroristsBilal Abdullah and Kafeel Ahmeddeliberately drove a Jeep Cherokee SUV loaded with propane cylinders into the glass doors of a crowded terminal at Glasgow International Airport in an attempted suicide attack. A concrete security pillar blocked the car from entering the terminal. The two perpetrators were both apprehended; Ahmed died of burn wounds sustained in the attack, while Abdullah was convicted in Woolwich Crown Court of conspiracy to murder through terrorism and was sentenced to at least 32 years' imprisonment. The perpetrators were also linked to a failed car bombing in London the previous day. Ahmed's brother Sabeel Ahmed pleaded guilty to failing to disclose information about an act of terrorism and was deported.
 29 November 2013 – 2013 Glasgow helicopter crash – A Eurocopter EC135-T2+ police helicopter (operated by Bond Air Services for Police Scotland) crashed on top of The Clutha Vaults Bar in Glasgow City Centre, killing all aboard the helicopter (the pilot and two crew members) and seven people in the pub. The cause of the crash was fuel starvation due to pilot error.
 23 May 2014 – Glasgow School of Art blaze – A fire tore through the historic and world-renowned Glasgow School of Art Mackintosh building, that was designed by Charles Rennie Mackintosh. Around a tenth of the structure and 30% of its contents were destroyed, including the prized Mackintosh Library. There were no deaths but a few were treated for minor smoke inhalation. The Scottish Fire and Rescue were praised for their quick response and plan to effectively tackle the fire. It was later found after a fire investigation that gases inside a projector had overheated and ignited.
 22 December 2014 – 2014 Glasgow bin lorry crash – Six people were killed and many were seriously injured when a bin lorry careened out of control and collided with pedestrians, vehicles, and buildings, on Queen Street, Glasgow, before crashing into the Millennium Hotel. The subsequent fatal accident inquiry established that the driver had suffered a "neurocardiogenic syncope" (fainting) episode that caused him to lose control of his vehicle.
 29 December 2014 – first Ebola virus case in Scotland – Pauline Cafferkey, a nurse returning to Glasgow from Kerry Town treatment centre, Sierra Leone, West Africa where she had been a volunteer caring for patients infected with the Ebola virus was taken into isolation after testing positive for the virus. She was not diagnosed before leaving Sierra Leone.
 15 June 2018 – A fire once again broke out in the partially restored Glasgow School of Art, causing extensive damage. The School was widely criticised for failing to install an effective modern sprinkler system in a timely manner. Emergency services received the first call at 11:19 pm BST, and 120 firefighters and 20 fire engines were dispatched to the fire. No casualties were reported. The cause of the fire is as yet unknown.

Namesake area on Mars
There is an area on Planet Mars which NASA has named Glasgow, after Scotland's largest city. The Mars rover Curiosity, which landed on the planet in August 2012, has drilled at the site.

Twin towns and sister cities
Glasgow is twinned with various cities.

  Nuremberg, Germany (since 1985)
  Rostov-on-Don, Russia (since 1986)
  Dalian, China (since 1997)
  Havana, Cuba (since 2002)
  Turin, Italy (since 2003)
  Marseille, France (since 2006)
  Lahore, Pakistan (since 2006)
  Bethlehem, Palestine (since 2007)
  Pittsburgh, USA (since 2020)

Partnerships
The city is also in a partnership with:

  Oulu, Finland
  Berlin, Germany
  Santiago, Chile

Notable people

Notes

References

Citations

Bibliography

 
 Butt, John, and George Gordon, eds. Strathclyde: Changing Horizons (1985)
 
 Cowan, J.  "From Glasgow's Treasure Chest" (1951)
 
 
 Cunnison, J. and JBS Gilfillan, The City of Glasgow, The Third Statistical Account of Scotland (1958)
 Daiches, David. Glasgow (1982), scholarly history
 Doak, A M and Young, A M. "Glasgow at a Glance" (1983)
 Gibb, Andrew. Glasgow: The Making of a City (1983)
 Gomme, A H and Walker, D. "Architecture of Glasgow" (1987)
 Horsey, M.  "Tenements & Towers: Glasgow Working-Class Housing 1890–1990" (1990)
 Hume, John.  "Industrial Archaeology of Glasgow" (1974)
 
 Maver, Irene. Glasgow  (2000)
 Malcolm, Sandra. "Old Glasgow and The Clyde: From the Archives of T. and R. Annan" (2005)
 McKean, Charles.  "Central Glasgow: An Illustrated Architectural Guide" (1993)
 Oakley,  Charles. The Second City (1975)
 Small, G P.  "Greater Glasgow: An Illustrated Architectural Guide" (2008)
 Urquhart, Gordon R.  "Along Great Western Road: An Illustrated History of Glasgow's West End" (2000)
 Williamson, Elizabeth et al. Glasgow (The Buildings of Scotland) (1999)
 Worsdall, Frank.  "The Tenement: A Way of Life" (1979)
 Worsdall, Frank.  "The City That Disappeared: Glasgow's Demolished Architecture" (1981)
 Worsdall, Frank.  "The Victorian City: Selection of Glasgow's Architecture" (1988)

External links
 
 Glasgow districts map and other Glasgow maps
 
 Glasgow City Council
 Interactive Attractions Map of Central Glasgow 
 TheGlasgowStory
 National Library of Scotland: Scottish Screen Archive (archive films relating to Glasgow)

 
Articles containing video clips

6th-century establishments in Scotland
Council areas of Scotland
Cities in Scotland
Lieutenancy areas of Scotland
Populated places established in the 6th century
Port cities and towns in Scotland
Populated places in Glasgow
Types of monuments and memorials